LaMont "ShowBoat" Robinson (born July 23, 1961) is an American professional basketball player that has been nominated to Naismith Memorial Basketball Hall of Fame in 2018 and 2019 and is a businessman, and founder and owner/player of the Harlem Clowns. In addition to his work with the Harlem Clowns, he is the founder of the Official Rhythm and Blues Music Hall of Fame.

Early life
Robinson grew up in Warrensville Heights, Ohio. He played for Warrensville Heights High School from 1976–1979, then moved to Jeannette, Pennsylvania, and played his senior year 1979–80 season at Jeannette High School, the same school his grandfather, John "ShowBoat" Henry Crowell, played football at. Robinson then played for Kankakee Junior College (Illinois), on a team with a 30–2 season that was ranked third in the nation. He then played for Central State University in Wilberforce, Ohio.

Basketball
Robinson went on to play basketball professionally in Copenhagen, Denmark, leading the country in scoring. He also played for the Long Island Knights in 1988 of the USBL and then went to veteran training camp with the Columbus Horizon of the CBA and traveled to Russia in 1989 with the Harlem Globetrotters and Washington Generals Tour. From 1995 to 2010, Robinson was a member of the Harlem Road Kings. In 2010, Robison founded the Harlem Clowns where he continues to serve as the owner/player.

In addition to playing with Harlem Globetrotters’ great Meadowlark Lemon (“Clown Prince of Basketball”) in the late 1980s and 1990s, he has played in every state, traveled to over 50 countries and has scored over 10,000 points in over 5,000 games. He has played more years than any other NBA player to this day.

Robinson is the “Comedy King of Basketball” with his team, “ShowBoat Robinson’s Fabulous Harlem Clowns.” 2017 is Robinson's 31st year as a player and 22nd year as an owner and operator of a comedy basketball team. As well as his basketball camps "ShowBoat" Robinson All-American Basketball Camp and his Say, No, To Drugs, and Yes, To, Life, and Family, and Education program that he has been taking into schools around the world since 1995.

His credentials include national and international television and newspaper appearances on CBS and USA Today. Robinson has made acquaintances with other well-known celebrities such as Michael Jordan, Jim Brown, Julius Erving aka Dr. J., and LeBron James. On November 1, 2001 Robinson sent his Harlem Road Kings uniform to the Naismith Memorial Basketball Hall of Fame to be displayed as an exhibit.

Music
In 2010, Robinson decided to pursue the idea of building a Rhythm & Blues Museum that would include everything from radio personalities and owners of record companies to Hip-Hop and Gospel music.  In 2014, Robinson copyrighted the name, Rhythm & Blues Hall of Fame.

When he was a child, Robinson's parents and grandparents took him to see the great acts of the 1960s and 1970s. It was this background that fostered his love for all types of music but, when he saw James Brown, Robinson instantly knew he wanted to be in entertainment himself. Although he chose sports, his love for music has been a lifelong passion.  The musicians he looked up to the most were James Brown, the Temptations and Berry Gordy as well as regularly watching television shows such as Soul Train, Ed Sullivan and Upbeat.

Gus Hawkins, Robinson's uncle, played saxophone for Edwin Starr, The O'Jays and many other acts at a club called Leo's Casino, which is where Robinson got his first glimpse of what the entertainment industry was really like. And he was hooked.

As a professional basketball player, Robinson met many entertainers and began collecting music memorabilia. His family had always collected so it was a natural continuation of a strong and enthusiastic family tradition.

Since 2013, Robinson has held induction ceremonies every year that have included The Temptations, The O’Jays, The Four Tops, The Chi-Lites, Gene "The Duke of Earl” Chandler, Michael Jackson, Whitney Houston, Chubby Checker, Berry Gordy, Ray Charles, Cathy Hughes, Morgan Freeman, Rev. Al Sharpton, and the Queen of Soul, Aretha Franklin. Ties with inductees and their families have been strong and artifacts for the museum have been gladly and generously donated. The Rhythm & Blues Hall of Fame has over 170 artists honored and inducted since 2013.

References

1961 births
Living people
American men's basketball players
Basketball players from Ohio
Central State Marauders basketball players
Junior college men's basketball players in the United States
People from Warrensville Heights, Ohio
Shooting guards
United States Basketball League players